The Daily Gamecock (formerly The Gamecock) is the editorially independent student news organization of the University of South Carolina.  It primarily serves the main campus of the University of South Carolina System in the state of South Carolina.

History

The first issue of The Gamecock was published on January 30, 1908. Robert Gonzales, a student, was primarily responsible for the paper's establishment.

In its first semester only three issues were produced, but in the following term the paper began weekly production. The paper eventually moved to publication on Monday, Wednesday, and Friday, and in the fall semester of 2006 began publishing Monday through Friday publication. At this time, it was renamed The Daily Gamecock and became the first student paper in South Carolina to publish daily. In the Fall of 2014 the paper ended Friday production, producing instead a tabloid-format known as Weekender. In the Fall of 2016 the paper moved two a twice-weekly production, Mondays and Thursdays, citing declining paper readership but increased digital readership. In fall 2018, the news organization's print edition moved to a once-weekly production with a circulation of 7,000.

On January 30, 2008, the newspaper completed 100 years of operation, which it marked with prizes, a special letterhead, historical headlines, and an alumni ball celebrated the milestone.

Due to the COVID-19 pandemic, the newspaper stopped publishing weekly print editions and moved almost entirely online in March 2020. Themed print editions now release once or twice a semester.

Content
The Daily Gamecock prints all-original coverage of daily news, USC sports, opinion, and the arts & culture of the USC campus and Columbia, SC area.

Awards and honors
The Gamecock has won many South Carolina Press Association awards and was a finalist for the National Pacemaker Awards for the Associated Collegiate Press in 1999. In October 2007, the Gamecock won the Sun Newspaper of the Year Award and ten other awards at the 2007 Southern University Newspaper Conference. The newspaper also won 31 SCPA awards in 2013. It also won first place in the "General Excellence" category (formerly "Best Overall") at the SCPA awards in 2009, 2010, 2011, 2012, 2013, 2014, 2020, and 2021.

In March 2006, The Daily Gamecock was recognized by the South Carolina Press Association for excellence for its coverage of Hurricane Katrina. Eight Gamecock staffers drove to hurricane-affected areas in Louisiana, Alabama, and Mississippi to report on the story.

The Daily Gamecock was awarded a "Top 10" national ranking by the Princeton Review in 2013 (#10). It was ranked No. 17 in 2011, the first time the newspaper appeared in the annual rankings.

Operations
The newspaper has a staff of more than 50 students, both paid and volunteers. The paper's senior staff are appointed by the editor-in-chief.

External links
Official website

Student newspapers published in South Carolina
Publications established in 1908
Daily newspapers published in the United States
1908 establishments in South Carolina